Jerome Heavens (born August 1, 1957) is a former Canadian football running back in the Canadian Football League (CFL) who played for the Toronto Argonauts. He played college football for the Notre Dame Fighting Irish.

References

1957 births
Living people
American football running backs
Canadian football running backs
Toronto Argonauts players
Notre Dame Fighting Irish football players